Kyree King (born July 9, 1994) is an American sprinter.

King competed collegiately at Western Kentucky before transferring to Oregon his senior year. He was an All-American in the 200 meters and was the 2017 Pac-12 Men's Track Athlete of the Year after winning the Pac-12 titles in the 100 meters, 200 meters and 4x100m relay that year.

On 10 August 2020, he ran 100 metres in 10.04 seconds at the Montverde Academy, Montverde, Florida which placed him joint 9th on the year list worldwide for 2020.

References

External links
 

 Kyree King USATF

Living people
1994 births
American male sprinters
Western Kentucky Hilltoppers and Lady Toppers athletes
Oregon Ducks men's track and field athletes
Track and field athletes from California
People from Ontario, California
World Athletics Championships athletes for the United States